Leptotes vellozicola is a species of orchid endemic to Brazil (Bahia).

References

External links 
 Report on the discovery of Leptotes vellozicola at neodiversity.org

vellozicola
Endemic orchids of Brazil
Orchids of Bahia